Volume 1: Sound Magic is the first album by Afro Celt Sound System.

Track listing

Personnel
 Ronan Browne – flute, mandolin, harmonium, uilleann pipes
 Jo Bruce – keyboards, programming
 Kauwding Cissokho – kora
 Massamba Diop – talking drum
 Simon Emmerson – guitar, programming
 James McNally – accordion, bodhran
 Iarla Ó Lionáird – vocals
 Ayub Ogada – vocals
 Martin Russell – keyboards, programming
 Davy Spillane – uilleann pipes

Additional personnel
 Malcolm Crosbie – guitar
 Simon Edwards – sintir
 Gary Finlayson – banjo
 John Fortis – bass, loops
 Angus R. Grant – fiddle
 Manu Katché – cymbals
 Caroline Lavelle – cello
 James MacKintosh – bongos
 Ian MacLeod – mandolin
 Levon Minassian – doudouk
 Myrdhin – harp
 Zil – vocal drone

Chart positions

Album

Single

References

1996 debut albums
Afro Celt Sound System albums
Real World Records albums